Broiler may refer to:

Broiler, (Gallus gallus domesticus), a type of chicken
a cooking device used for broiling, i.e. cooking food by applying heat from above
Charbroiler, a cooking device sometimes referred to simply as a broiler
Broiler (music producers), Norwegian DJ duo

See also 
 Broiler industry,  the process by which broiler chickens are reared and prepared for meat consumption
 Barbecue grill, a device which cooks food by applying heat from below
 Gridiron (cooking), a metal grate with parallel bars typically used for grilling
 Boiler (power generation), is a device used to create steam by applying heat energy to water.